Broad Law is a hill in the Manor Hills range, part of the Southern Uplands of Scotland. The second-highest point in the Southern Uplands and the highest point in the Scottish Borders, it has an elevation of 840 metres, a prominence of 653 metres (and thus is a "major") and an isolation of 81 kilometres. It is only  lower than its parent, Merrick. Like many of its neighbours it is smooth, rounded and grassy, although the surrounding glens have very steep sides — country somewhat akin to the Cheviots or the Howgill Fells. On the summit is the highest VOR beacon in the UK, and also a radio tower.

The summit of Broad Law is also the highest point (county top) of the historic county of Peeblesshire. It is also sometimes (erroneously) given as the county top of Selkirkshire. This is because in 1891, the area of Megget (a detached part of Lyne parish in Peeblesshire) was transferred to Yarrow parish in Selkirkshire. The administrative "county" boundary of Peeblesshire and Selkirkshire thus temporarily crossed Broad Law summit between 1891 and 1974. However, the historic county boundary remained several kilometres to the east, where Dun Rig is the county top of Selkirkshire.

References

Marilyns of Scotland
Donald mountains
Corbetts
Mountains and hills of the Scottish Borders
Highest points of historic Scottish counties